Pieter Klaas ter Veer (22 December 1944 – 11 December 2022) was a Dutch dairy farmer and politician. A member of the Democrats 66, he served in the House of Representatives from 1981 to 1982 and again from 1989 to 2002.

Ter Veer died in Heemstede on 11 December 2022, at the age of 77.

References

1944 births
2022 deaths
Dutch farmers
Democrats 66 politicians
People from Zuidhorn
Members of the House of Representatives (Netherlands)
20th-century Dutch politicians
21st-century Dutch politicians